Shilmuri is a union territory of Barura upazila in Comilla district in southern Bangladesh.

Geography 
Shilmuri South Union is located in the eastern part of Baruda upazila. It is bounded on the north and west by Shilmuri North Union, on the south by Galimpur Union and Baki North Union of Lalmai Upazila, on the southeast by Bagmara South Union and Bagmara North Union of Lalmai Upazila and on the east by Barpara Union of Comilla Sadar South Upazila.

The area of this union is almost 4221 acres.

Population 
The total population is 24493.

Administrative structure 
No. 9 Union Parishad is under Baruda upazila of Shilmuri North Union. Administrative activities of this union are under Baruda police station. It is part of Comilla-6, the 256th constituency of the Jatiya Sangsad.

Education

List of government primary schools

Secondary high schools

See also 
 Barura Upazila
 Comilla District

References

External links 
 

Cumilla District